Arthur Gordon Peters  (born 21 December 1935) is a Canadian Anglican bishop.

Bishop Peters was educated at the University of King's College and ordained deacon in 1963.
After a curacy at Waverly he became Rector of Weymouth. He held further incumbencies at Annapolis-Granville and Christ Church, Sydney before being elected bishop coadjutor of Nova Scotia and Prince Edward Island in 1982. Two years later he succeeded as diocesan bishop. In 1997, the Bishops of the Ecclesiastical Province of Canada elected him as their metropolitan archbishop and he assumed the title Archbishop of Nova Scotia and Prince Edward Island Metropolitan of the Ecclesiastical Province of Canada, retiring in 2002.

References

1935 births
University of King's College alumni
20th-century Anglican Church of Canada bishops
21st-century Anglican Church of Canada bishops
Anglican bishops of Nova Scotia and Prince Edward Island
Metropolitans of Canada
20th-century Anglican archbishops
21st-century Anglican archbishops
Living people